A water gun is a type of toy gun that shoots jets of water.

Water gun or watergun may also refer to:

Music 
 "Watergun" (song), a 2023 song by Remo Forrer
 "Water Guns", a song by Todrick Hall from the 2016 album Straight Outta Oz
 "Waterguns", a song by Caravan Palace from the 2019 album Chronologic

Other uses 
 Deluge gun, a piece of firefighting equipment
 Water cannon
 Underwater firearm

See also 
 Waterpistol (album), a 1995 album by Shack